Dam, also stylised as DAM, is a South African psychological thriller television series created by Alex Yazbek and developed by Picture Tree. The 8-episode first season premiered on 22 February 2021 on Showmax.

Dam'''s first season received critical acclaim and was one of the top ten most watched shows on Showmax in 2021. It became the most nominated series at the 2022 South African Film and Television Awards at nomination tally of 11, including Best TV Drama as well as 5 acting nominations, with supporting actress Natasha Loring winning hers. In August 2022, the series was renewed for a second season.

Cast
Main
 Lea Vivier as Yola Fischer
 Wane Cockroft as Young Yola
 Pallance Dladla as Themba Zita
 Natasha Loring as Sienna Fischer
 Neil Sandilands as Bernoldus

Supporting

Episodes
Series overview

Season 1 (2021)

Season 2 (2023)

Production
Alex Yazbek is the series' creator, writer, and director. Joining him on the creative team were Tom Marais as cinematographer, Sue Steele as production designer, Smartie Olifant as head of make-up, and Brendan Jury in charge of the music.

The cast of Dam was revealed at the beginning of January 2021, with Lea Vivier set to lead the series alongside Antoinette Louw, Neil Sandilands, Faniswa Yisa, Pallance Dladla, Natasha Loring, Siv Ngesi, Laudo Liebenberg, and Gerald Steyn.

Principal photography for the first season began in September 2020 and took place on location in the Eastern Cape towns of Bedford and Adelaide. Production for the second season returned to Bedford and Adelaide, and was underway as of August 2022.

Awards and nominations

References

External links
 
 Dam'' at TVSA

2021 South African television series debuts
2020s South African television series
English-language Showmax original programming
Mass media in the Eastern Cape
Psychological thriller television series